Freedom of panorama (FOP) is a provision in the copyright laws of various jurisdictions that permits taking photographs and video footage and creating other images (such as paintings) of buildings and sometimes sculptures and other art works which are permanently located in a public place, without infringing on any copyright that may otherwise subsist in such works, and the publishing of such images. Panorama freedom statutes or case law limit the right of the copyright owner to take action for breach of copyright against the creators and distributors of such images. It is an exception to the normal rule that the copyright owner has the exclusive right to authorize the creation and distribution of derivative works. The phrase is derived from the German term  ("panorama freedom").

History
In the past, photography and other methods of visually representing public space were severely restricted, for reasons other than authors' rights. France prohibited such acts in the 19th century for protection of privacy. Italy began disallowing representations of archaeological sites in engravings in the 18th century, even if such sites were found in public places, as a protection of their cultural heritage.

The concept of freedom of panorama originated in Germany in the 19th century. The Kingdom of Bavaria introduced an analogous exception in 1840 for pictorial depictions of "works of arts and architecture in their exterior contours" in public spaces. It was intended to reduce the severity of the new copyright rules of the German Confederation which prohibited reproductions, with exception to "mechanical reproductions." Other component states of the confederation soon emulated the legal right, and in 1876 the legal right, based on Bavarian exception, was finally implemented throughout the confederation by the German parliament.

Laws around the world
Many countries have similar provisions restricting the scope of copyright law in order to explicitly permit photographs involving scenes of public places or scenes photographed from public places. Other countries, though, differ widely in their interpretation of the principle.

European Union

In the European Union, Directive 2001/29/EC provides for the possibility of member states having a freedom of panorama clause in their copyright laws, but does not require such a rule.

In 2015, former German MEP Felix Reda proposed applying freedom of panorama to all countries of the European Union. He claimed that through the exception people would be free to share images of public spaces that might contain buildings and public art, in order "to express and share their experiences and thoughts" and to "preserve our journeys and curate our impressions for entire generations to come."

His proposal was criticized by former French MEP Jean-Marie Cavada, who introduced an alternate proposal seeking to restrict freedom of panorama provisions of all the European Union countries to non-commercial uses only. Cavada claimed that commercial freedom of panorama harms the rights of the authors of architectural and artistic works by allowing entities like Wikimedia and Facebook to exploit the works commercially without compensation to the authors; his office added that non-commercial freedom of panorama would not affect Internet freedom, but would guarantee that "platforms like Facebook, Instagram, and Flickr provide fair compensation to artists." Criticism to Cavada's proposal culminated in an online petition by digital rights activists with hashtag #SaveFOP, garnering more than 460,000 signatures within two weeks after its launch.

Critics of Wikipedia's intervention to the matter allege that their campaign is "bogus and misleading", since the European Parliament has no power to pass a legislation; that responsibility falls on the European Commission.

On July 9, the plenary of the European Parliament rejected both proposals, thereby maintaining the status of freedom of panorama throughout the European Union.

Belgium 

Freedom of panorama was introduced in Belgium on June 27, 2016, with the addition of a new provision in the Economic Code. According to XI.190 2/1°, the authors of architectural, visual, and graphic artworks permanently situated in public places cannot restrict the reproduction and public communication of such works, "providing that it concerns the reproduction or communication of the work as it is and that said reproduction or public communication does not affect the normal exploitation of the work and does not unreasonably prejudice the legitimate interests of the author." The provision came into effect on July 15, 2016.

Since the provision became effective, people are able to take photographs of Brussels' famous Atomium landmark and distribute these for any purpose, including sharing of such photos to their families and friends on social media, freely and without risk of copyright lawsuits from the current copyright holders of the work. The rightsholders of Atomium, however, continue to assert that commercial uses of any depictions of the landmark are still subject to prior permission and royalty fees, notwithstanding the introduction of the legal right in the country.

Denmark 
Article 24(2) of the Danish copyright law allows the pictorial reproductions of artistic works situated in public places, if the purpose is non-commercial. Article 24(3) states that buildings can be freely reproduced in pictorial form.

There is still no full freedom of panorama for non-architectural works in Denmark. The Little Mermaid, a sculpture of Edvard Eriksen (who died in 1959), is under copyright until 2030, and the Eriksen family is known to be litigious. Several Danish newspapers have been sued for using images of the sculpture without permission by the Eriksen family. The purpose of the Danish media is considered commercial. Søren Lorentzen, photo editor of Berlingske which was one of the newspapers slapped with fines, once lamented, "We used a photo without asking for permission. That was apparently a clear violation of copyright laws, even though I honestly have a hard time understanding why one can't use photos of a national treasure like the Little Mermaid without violating copyright laws." Alice Eriksen, granddaughter of the sculptor, defended the restrictions and said that such restrictions are in compliance of the laws of the country. She added, "It's the same as receiving royalties when a song is played." Berlingske was sued again recently, after exploiting the statue in 2019 as an illustration in a cartoon concerning debate culture in the country, as well as using an image of the sculpture in 2020 "to represent a link between the far right and people fearing COVID-19." They were ordered by the Eastern High Court to pay 300,000 kroner ($46,000) worth of compensation to the Eriksen family, which was increased from 285,000 kroner ($44,000) as ruled by a district court. , the 2019 caricature case has reached the Supreme Court; the Process Licensing Board remarked that the case must be heard there as it "is of a principled nature."

Estonia 
Freedom of panorama in Estonia, found at Section 20¹ of the Copyright Act, is restricted to non-commercial use of images of works of architecture, visual art, applied art, and photographs permanently situated in places open to the public. Also, the images must not show the said works as main subjects. A very limited provision for commercial use of architecture exists at Section 20², restricted for "real estate advertisements" only.

Finland 
Finnish freedom of panorama, found at third and fourth paragraphs of Article 25a of their copyright law, is very limited when it comes to public art. Works permanently located in public spaces cannot be photographed for commercial purposes if those become the main subjects in the photographs. The provision, however, explicitly permits newspapers and magazines to fully exploit public art, provided that there exist captions that accompany the published photographs. In contrast, buildings can be freely photographed with no non-commercial restrictions.

France 

Since October 7, 2016, article L122-5 of the French Code of Intellectual Property provides for a limited freedom of panorama for works of architecture and sculpture. The code authorizes "reproductions and representations of works of architecture and sculpture, placed permanently in public places (voie publique), and created by natural persons, with the exception of any usage of a commercial character". French lawmakers and politicians were reluctant to introduce freedom of panorama in the past; former National Assembly member Patrick Bloche in 2011 called freedom of panorama an "amendement Wikipédia".

Various contemporary French architecture are protected by copyright, and commercial reproductions of these by photographers, filmmakers, graphic artists, or other third party users without permission from the architect or the entity whom the architect has assigned their patrimonial rights to could mean copyright infringement. Two separate court decisions in 1990 ruled that unauthorized postcards depicting Grande Arche and La Géode as principal subjects constitute infringements. Other monumental works protected by copyright include the Louvre Pyramid, the Opéra Bastille, and the new buildings of the Bibliothèque nationale de France.

However, French jurisprudence considers a certain reproduction as not infringing copyright if it constitutes as an "accessory" element to the main subject being depicted. In a 2005 case concerning postcards of Lyon's Place des Terreaux, the Cour de cassation upheld the lower courts' decisions on the accessory inclusion of the plaza's modern artistic constructions on postcards, stating that the works blended with the public domain architecture of the plaza surroundings, and that "the work of art was of secondary importance to the subject", which is the plaza itself.

CEVM (Compagnie Eiffage du Viaduc de Millau), the exclusive beneficiary of all property rights of Millau Viaduct on behalf of its architect Norman Foster, in their website explicitly requires that professional and/or commercial uses of images of the bridge are subject to "prior express permission of the CEVM". Additionally, CEVM has the sole right to distribute images of the viaduct in souvenir items such as postcards. However, private and/or non-commercial uses of images are tolerated by CEVM. Also exempted from obligatory permission and remuneration payment are "landscape images where the Viaduct appears in the background and is thus not the main focus of the image."

Germany 
 is defined in article 59 of the German .

Greece 
Freedom of panorama does not exist in Greece. The Greek copyright law, 2121/1993 on Copyright, Related Rights and Cultural Matters (as last amended in 2021), only provides a vague but restrictive exception allowing "occasional reproduction and communication by the mass media of images of architectural works, fine art works, photographs or works of applied art, which are sited permanently in a public place."

Hungary 
Article 68(1) of the Hungarian copyright law states that views of fine arts, architectural and applied arts permanently situated in public outdoors can be made and used without the need of permission from and remuneration to the authors of the works.

Ireland 
Article 93 of the Copyright and Related Rights Act, 2000 provides freedom of panorama for buildings (and models thereof), sculptures and works of artistic craftsmanship which are "permanently situated in a public place or in premises open to the public". Such works may be photographed, filmed, broadcast on television, or otherwise reproduced without infringing the copyright in the work. Copies of such reproductions do not infringe the copyright in the original work.

Italy 
In Italy freedom of panorama does not exist. Despite many official protests and a national initiative led by the lawyer Guido Scorza and the journalist Luca Spinelli (who highlighted the issue), the publishing of photographic reproductions of public places is still prohibited, in accordance with the old Italian copyright laws.

Latvia 
Latvian copyright law provides for a restrictive freedom of panorama provision limited to non-commercial uses only. Images of works permanently showcased in public spaces, including achitecture, visual arts, and applied arts, can only be exploited "for personal use and as information in news broadcasts or reports of current events, or include in works for non-commercial purposes."

Luxembourg 
Freedom of panorama is not granted in Luxembourg. Article 10(7°) of their copyright law permits the depictions of public art found in publicly-accessible places, if the said works "are not the main subject of reproduction or communication."

Poland 

There is adequate freedom of panorama in Poland, guaranteed by Article 33(1) of the  Act on Copyright and Related Rights. It states that "it is permissible to disseminate works permanently displayed in generally accessible roads, streets, squares or gardens, but not for the same use." Distribution is through the use of photographs or pictorial representations of works (such as buildings and public sculptures) in any media, including commercial video games and apps. Because the purpose of a photograph of such a work (such as an office building, a shopping mall, or a bridge) is not the same as the original purpose of establishing a work, it is a permissible use under national copyright law.

Portugal 
Freedom of panorama for Portuguese works is found at Article 75, paragraph 2, point q. of the Portuguese Code of Authors' Rights and Neighbouring Rights, covering permanent works in public spaces such as architecture and sculptures. However, it is regulated by Article 76, paragraph 1, point a., that requires attribution of the author and the identification of the name of the work for every free use, including the use of works under Portuguese freedom of panorama.

Romania 

There is no full freedom of panorama in Romania; it is limited only to non-commercial purposes. Under Article 35(f) of their copyright law, it is allowed to reproduce, distribute, and communicate to the public images of architectural, sculptural, photographic, and applied art works situated in public places, except that if the works become the main subject of the reproduction and if this reproduction is used for commercial purposes.

The heirs of Anca Petrescu, the architect of the colossal Palace of the Parliament, sued the Romanian Parliament for selling photos and other souvenirs with the image of the iconic building. The copyright infringement trial is ongoing.

Slovenia 
Article 55 of the Copyright and Related Rights Act of Slovenia states that "Works that are permanently situated in parks, streets, squares, or other generally accessible places shall be freely exploited," but this is prohibited if the intent of exploitation is for profit. In practice, however, this means that without permission from the author of the works, objects like buildings and statues whose copyrights have not yet expired can only be photographed for personal use, and publications of such images in a tourism portal or a newspaper are prohibited (since newspaper publishing is considered commercial).

Spain 

The copyright law of Spain provides a freedom of panorama provision at Article 35(2), which states that "works permanently located in parks, streets, squares or other public thoroughfares may be freely reproduced, distributed and communicated by means of paintings, drawings, photographs and audiovisual procedures."

Commercial uses of several Spanish buildings may be restricted by virtue of trademark law. Santiago Calatrava's Auditorio de Tenerife can be freely photographed by tourists, but as a trademarked work since 2003, it cannot be freely used by commercial photographers and cinematographers unless the said users pay relevant fees to the owner of the building. It is also required to make a deposit to ensure the photographs are used appropriately.

Sweden 
On April 4, 2016, the Swedish Supreme Court ruled that Wikimedia Sweden infringed on the copyright of artists of public artwork by creating a website and database of public artworks in Sweden, containing images of public artwork uploaded by the public. Swedish copyright law contains an exception to the copyright holder's exclusive right to make their works available to the public that allows depictions of public artwork. The Swedish Supreme Court decided to take a restrictive view of this copyright exception. The Court determined that the database was not of insignificant commercial value, for both the database operator or those accessing the database, and that "this value should be reserved for the authors of the works of art. Whether the operator of the database actually has a commercial purpose is then irrelevant." The case was returned to a lower court to determine damages that Wikimedia Sweden owes to the collective rights management agency Bildkonst Upphovsrätt i Sverige (BUS), which initiated the lawsuit on behalf of artists they represent.

In 2017, Wikimedia Sweden was ordered to pay damages equivalent to around $89,000 USD to BUS.

Former USSR countries

Almost all countries from the former Soviet Union lack complete freedom of panorama. In particular, Article 21 of the copyright law of Kazakhstan allows uses of works of architecture, photographs, and fine arts, but does not allow commercial uses if the works become main subjects of the images.

The Ukrainian copyright law does not grant freedom of panorama; four separate court rulings during 2007–09 found that four users who exploited Vasyl Borodai's 1982 artistic work Monument to the Founders of Kyiv in the late 1990s and early 2000s violated the sculptor's "author rights". These users, independent of each other, were Ukrgasbank, which used an image of this work in their advertisements, FOLIO Publishing House, which exploited it as a book cover for their non-educational book, and Molochnik and VK and K, which both used an image of the same monument as food packaging design.

Exceptions are three countries whose copyright laws were amended recently. The first was Moldova in July 2010, when the law in question was approximated to EU standards. Armenia followed in April 2013 with an updated Armenian law on copyright. Freedom of panorama was partially adopted in Russia on October 1, 2014; from this day, one is allowed to freely use images of buildings and gardens visible from public places, but not for images of other works like sculptures.

Central America 
The majority of Spanish-speaking countries in Central America do not allow broad freedom of panorama. The copyright laws of Guatemala, Honduras, and Nicaragua only permit personal uses of pictorial representations of public art permanently found on streets, squares, and other types of public spaces as well as exteriors of architectural works. Article 71 of the Costa Rican copyright law allows taking photographs of public art like monuments and statues in public spaces but only for non-commercial purposes.

There are no non-commercial or personal-use-only restrictions imposed on the freedom of panorama provisions of the copyright laws of El Salvador and Panama.

Section 78 of the Copyright Act of Belize explicitly permits representing works of architecture, sculpture, and artistic craftsmanship in paintings, photographs, films, or broadcasts, as long as these are permanently seen in public spaces or publicly-accessible premises.

OAPI member states 
Freedom of panorama is restricted within Organisation Africaine de la Propriété Intellectuelle (OAPI), which consists of Benin, Burkina Faso, Cameroon, Central African Republic, Chad, Comoros, Congo, Ivory Coast, Equatorial Guinea, Gabon, Guinea, Guinea-Bissau, Mali, Mauritania, Niger, Senegal, and Togo. In accordance with the Annex VII, Part I, Article 16 of the Bangui Agreement, it is allowed to share or distribute images of architecture, fine arts, photographs, or applied art permanently located in public spaces, but not for commercial purposes if those become main subjects of the images.

Australia

In Australia, freedom of panorama is dealt with in the federal Copyright Act 1968, sections 65 to 68. Section 65 provides: "The copyright in a work ... that is situated, otherwise than temporarily, in a public place, or in premises open to the public, is not infringed by the making of a painting, drawing, engraving or photograph of the work or by the inclusion of the work in a cinematograph film or in a television broadcast". This applies to any "artistic work" as defined in paragraph (c) of section 10: a "work of artistic craftsmanship" (but not a circuit layout). Section 66 of the Act provides exceptions to infringement of copyright in buildings and models of buildings by including the buildings in photos and depictions.

There is no right to reproduce artistic works outside the ambit of these provisions. This means the reproduction of "street art" can potentially infringe copyright.

Several artists' groups have criticized the Australian freedom of panorama, with respect to sculptures and works of artistic craftsmanship, claiming that free shooting of such works in public spaces "conflicts with the normal exploitation rights of the artist by allowing others to freely exploit their work." This, according to Arts Law Center, "is unfair on artists who produce works for public display," since the artists only receive low median incomes from commissions. They also added that Section 65 is disadvantageous to indigenous peoples of the country by discouraging them to permanently showcase their works in public spaces, as any free use leads to "irreparable cultural harm". They have called for either abolition of this freedom of panorama provision or modifying it to only limit it to non-commercial uses.

Brazil 

A freedom of panorama provision is provided at Article 48 of the Brazilian copyright law. It states that "works permanently located in public places may be freely represented through paintings, drawings, photographs, and audiovisual processes."

Canada 
Section 32.2(1) of the Copyright Act (Canada) states the following:

The Copyright Act also provides specific protection for the incidental inclusion of another work seen in the background of a photo. Photos that "incidentally and not deliberately" include another work do not infringe copyright.

China 

Article 24(10) of the copyright law of China provides a sufficient freedom of panorama provision. Accordingly, it is allowed to exploit an artistic work "located or on display in a public place" by means of drawing, photography, or videography without permission from and remuneration to the copyright holder, "provided that the name of the author and the title of the work shall be mentioned."

Because of relevant provisions under One country, two systems, the said exception does not apply to both Hong Kong and Macau.

Hong Kong and Macau 
Section 71 of Hong Kong's Copyright Ordinance (Chapter 528) allows for representations sculptures and works of artistic craftsmanship "permanently situated in public place or in premises open to the public" and buildings through drawings, paintings, photographs, films, and broadcasting, and considers making copies of representations of such works as not infringing the copyright of such works.

Section 61(l) of Macau's Decree-Law No. 43/99/M of August 16, 1999, on the Regime of Copyright and Related Rights permits photographic, videographic, and cinematographic representations of artistic works situated in public places.

Democratic Republic of the Congo 
Freedom of panorama is very limited in the copyright law of the Democratic Republic of the Congo. Article 28 permits photography, cinematography, and television broadcasting of architecture, though photos of such works can only be legally used in newspapers, journals, and school textbooks. Article 29, which deals with "figurative works of art that are permanently located in a public place," only allows representations of such works through film and television programs.

Iceland 
Icelandic copyright law does not provide full freedom of panorama. Article 16 permits photography and presentation of resulting images of buildings and public art outdoors, but if these became the main subjects of the images and the images are used commercially, the authors of buildings and public art are "entitled for remuneration". Such mandatory payment is not required if the user is a newspaper publisher or a television broadcaster.

India 

Freedom of panorama is dealt with in sections 52, s–u(i) of the copyright law of India. Both (s) and (t) of section 52 applies to depictions of architecture, sculptures, and works of artistic craftsmanship through drawing, painting, engraving, and photography, while (u)(i) applies to cinematographic inclusion of all types of artistic works. These provisions are applicable if the work is "permanently situate in a public place or any premises to which the public has access." (u)(ii) is for the incidental cinematographic inclusion of works not located in public spaces.

The case The Daily Calendar Supplying v. The United Concern (1958) concerned the Daily Calendar Supplying Bureau's commercial distributions of slightly-modified reproductions of an oil painting of Lord Subramania by the firm United Concern. The firm acquired artistic property rights over the painting from its artist T. M. Subramaniam, soon after the artistic work was created in 1947. The user was ordered to pay 1,000 rupees worth of copyright damage to the firm. The Madras High Court rejected the argument of the Daily Calendar Supplying in their 1964 appeal, that their act falls under Section 52(t), since the original painting was still under the artist's private custody even if free copies were already being distributed to several temples in the south. This distribution is "not tantamount to his installing his original work in a public place."

Israel 
Israeli freedom of panorama is found at Section 23 of the Copyright Act, 2007 (as amended on July 28, 2011), which states that it is permitted to visually represent works of architecture, sculpture, and applied art through drawing, sketching, photography, and broadcasting, if the said works are "permanently situated 
in a public place."

Japan 
The copyright law of Japan provides for a limited freedom of panorama for outdoor artistic works and full freedom of panorama for buildings. Article 46 of the Copyright Act (Act No. 48 of May 6, 1970, as amended 2020) allows for exploitations of reproductions of artistic works "permanently installed in an outdoor location" and architectural works for any purposes, but in the case of artistic works, this right does not apply if the reproduction is made "for the purpose of selling copies of it, or selling those copies." Article 48 obliges the users of images of such works to mention the source if provided and in accordance with the common practice.

It is important to note the 2003 ruling of the Osaka District Court, which states that "architectural works" protected under this law only includes buildings with distinct aesthetic and creative properties. There are also legal interpretations which hold that the Tower of the Sun in Suita, Osaka Prefecture must be classified as an artistic work rather than an architectural work. This means any images of this landmark cannot be used commercially, even if there is full freedom of panorama for buildings in Japan.

Lebanon 
Freedom of panorama in Lebanon is restricted to the publications of pictorial representations of architecture, visual arts, photographs, or applied art by the "media" only, in accordance with Article 31 of Law No. 75 of April 3, 1999, on the Protection of Literary and Artistic Property.

Malaysia 

Under Section 13(2) of the Copyright Act 1987 (Act 332, as at 1 January 2006), the right to control does not include:

"Artistic work" is defined at Section 3(f) as encompassing works of architecture, models of architecture, sculptures, graphic works, and works of artistic craftsmanship, but explicitly excludes layout designs.

Mexico 
The copyright law of Mexico provides for a freedom of panorama provision at Article 148(VII):

Morocco 
The Moroccan copyright law does not provide full freedom of panorama. The relevant provision at Section 20 only allows republication, broadcasting, and communication to public of images of architecture, works of fine art, photographic works, and works applied art permanently situated in publicly-open place, if the depicted work is not the main subject. If it becomes the main subject, the reproduction should not be used commercially.

On December 12, 1955, the Court of Appeal of Rabat ruled that "the fact of building or placing an architectural work in a public place does not in itself imply any loss of artistic property rights."

Namibia
The Copyright and Neighbouring Rights Protection Act, 1994 (Act 6 of 1994) does not give complete freedom of panorama. Section 18(1)(b) only permits the presentation of artistic works "permanently situated in a street, square or a similar public place" in cinematograph films or in television broadcasts.

New Zealand
Under the Copyright Act (1994) of New Zealand, exemptions exist for free sharing of photographs of certain works like sculptures, but none for graphic works like murals and street art, even if these are located in public spaces. This means permission from the artists or whoever is the copyright holder is required to freely take photographs of such graphic works for sharing purposes, especially with commercial intent. However, this restriction is largely ignored, as evidenced by tourists' continued sharing of such images on social media and marketing companies' utilizations of copyrighted graphic works as background elements in advertisements. In 2019, artist Xoë Hall expressed her indignation over Whitcoulls's use of images of her Wellington mural in their calendars, and suggested her peer muralists in New Zealand "have a contract for every wall they paint, stating who owns the copyright, and to include that in the mural with the artist's name."

Nigeria
Freedom of panorama in Nigeria is provided at item (d) of the Second Schedule ("Exceptions from copyright control"), stating that artistic works found in public places can be reproduced and the resulting copies distributed.

Norway
Section 31 of the 2018 Norwegian copyright law grants restricted freedom of panorama for artistic works permanently situated in public spaces, permitting only non-commercial reproductions if the works become main subjects of depictions. However, architecture can be freely depicted regardless of intent.

Pakistan
The copyright law of Pakistan grants freedom of panorama under Section 57. Both (r) and (s) of section 57 applies to depictions of architecture, sculptures, and works of artistic craftsmanship through drawing, painting, engraving, and photography, while (t)(i) applies to cinematographic inclusion of all types of artistic works. These provisions are applicable if the work is "permanently situated in a public place or any premises to which the public has access." (t)(ii) is for the incidental cinematographic inclusion of artistic works not located in public spaces.

Philippines 
The Intellectual property Code of the Philippines (Republic Act No. 8923) makes no specific provision for freedom of panorama. A very limited provision does exists at Section 184(d) which states "the reproduction and communication to the public of literary, scientific or artistic works as part of reports of current events by means of photography, cinematography or broadcasting to the extent necessary for the purpose."

On February 4, 2021, Intellectual Property Office of the Philippines Director-General Rowel Barba proposed to the House of Representatives to include freedom of panorama in the amendments to the Intellectual Property Code. House Bill No. 2672 to place freedom of panorama under Sub-section m, Section 184, of the Intellectual Property Code had been filed by Representative Christopher de Venecia of Pangasinan . , the bill was pending in the House of Representatives.

Singapore 
The copyright law of Singapore guarantees sufficient freedom of panorama, under Sections 63 and 64. Section 63 deals with sculptures and works of artistic craftsmanship that are permanently located in public places or publicly-open premises, while Section 64 covers buildings and models of buildings. Allowable representations are painting, drawing, engraving, photography, cinematography, and television broadcasting.

South Africa 
The copyright law of South Africa does not grant freedom of panorama. An exception is provided at Section 15(3) for artistic works permanently situated in public places, but only limits to "reproduction or inclusion in a cinematograph film or a television broadcast or transmission in a diffusion service." The "diffusion service" is defined in Section 1(1) as "a telecommunication service of transmissions consisting of sounds, images, signs or signals, which takes place over wires or other paths provided by material substance and intended for reception by specific 
members of the public;...and where sounds, images, signs or signals are displayed or emitted by any receiving apparatus to which they are conveyed by diffusion in such manner as to constitute a performance or a causing of sounds, images, signs or signals to be seen or heard in public, this shall be deemed to be effected by the operation of the receiving apparatus."

South Korea 

A freedom of panorama provision is provided at Article 35 of the South Korean copyright law, but is restricted to non-commercial purposes only. The provision states that works of art, buildings, and photographs that are permanently situated in open places can be exploited for any purposes, except in cases:
 "Where a building is reproduced into another building;"
 "Where a sculpture or painting is reproduced into another sculpture or painting;"
 "Where the reproduction is made in order to exhibit permanently at an open place;"
 "Where the reproduction is made for the purpose of selling its copies."

There was a case in 2008 which concerned an advertisement company's unauthorized use of a building in advertisements. Pomato Co., Ltd. used architect Min Gyu-am's "UV House", located in Paju, by their inclusion of the building as the background element of a 2005 television and Internet advertisement for the Kookmin Bank. The architect received a rental fee for the place, but he did not grant permission to use its copyright. After the advertisements were released, the architect said they used the architectural work without his permission, so he claims for damages. In the first trial, the Seoul Central District Court judged that the appearance of the building used in the advertisements is small compared to the whole, so it cannot be seen as a copyright infringement. During the second trial, on November 7, 2008, both parties agreed to compensation payment. So with the completion of mediation, the second trial ended without a ruling.

Sri Lanka
The Intellectual Property Act, No. 36 of 2003 does not contain a freedom of panorama provision in the list of limitations to copyright at Section 12. The law repealed the Code of Intellectual Property Act No. 52 of 1979, which had a limited freedom of panorama provision at Section 13(d) that granted filmmakers and television broadcasters the right to reproduce works of art and architecture "permanently located in a place where they can be viewed by the public."

Switzerland
Freedom of panorama is regulated in article  27 of the Swiss Urheberrechtsgesetz, which states that works permanently situated on public grounds can be visually represented for any purposes, provided that the representation is not in three-dimensional form and cannot be used "for the same purpose as the original."

Taiwan 

Article 58 of the Copyright Act of Taiwan provides for a freedom of panorama exception, wherein architectural and artistic works "displayed on a long-term basis" in outdoor places open to the public may be exploited for any purposes. This does not apply if the reproduction of artistic works is purely for the purpose of selling copies.

The restricted freedom of panorama for artistic works was affirmed in 2022 correspondences from the Intellectual Property Office of the Ministry of Economic Affairs, in clarifying the non-commercial restriction of the Taiwanese freedom of panorama for non-architectural works. Nevertheless, commercial media like post cards that only show the artistic works incidentally, like in the background, are permissible.

Thailand 
Freedom of panorama is dealt with in Sections 37–39 of the copyright law of Thailand. Sections 37 and 38 allow representations through "drawing, painting, construction, engraving, molding, carving, lithographing, photographing, cinematographing, and video broadcasting" of artistic works in public places and architecture, while Section 39 allows pictorial and videographic representations of "a work of which an artistic work is a component."

Turkey 
Under article 40 of the copyright law of Turkey:

Uganda 
Freedom of panorama is granted in Uganda under Section 15(1)(f) of The Copyright and Neighbouring Rights Act, 2006, which states that architectural or artistic works permanently located in a public place can be reproduced and communicated to public through photography, audiovisual works, and television broadcasting. Under Section 2 of the law, "public place" is broadly defined as "any building, or conveyance to which for the time being the public are entitled or permitted to have access, with or without payment," ranging from cinemas and restaurants to sports facilities and resorts.

United Arab Emirates 

Article 22(7) of the Federal Law No. 38 of 2021 on Copyrights and Neighboring Rights does not grant freedom of panorama. It only permits exhibitions of fine, applied, plastic, and architectural arts permanently located in public places "in broadcasts". Article 22(7) of the repealed Federal Law No. 7 of 2002 on Copyrights and Neighboring Rights gives similar restrictive legal right.

Protected works in the United Arab Emirates include the Burj Al Arab, the Burj Khalifa, and Sheikh Zayed Mosque. Due to Wikimedia's stringent licensing rules, submitted images showing modern architecture without proper permissions were taken down at the end of the first edition of the Wiki Loves Emirates campaign in 2018.

United Kingdom

Under UK law, freedom of panorama covers all buildings as well as most three-dimensional works such as sculptures that are permanently situated in a public place. The freedom does not generally extend to two-dimensional copyright works such as murals or posters. A photograph which makes use of the freedom may be published in any way without breaching copyright.

Section 62 of the Copyright, Designs and Patents Act 1988 is broader than the corresponding provisions in many other countries, and allows photographers to take pictures of buildings, defined in section 4(2) as "any fixed structure, and a part of a building or fixed structure". There is no requirement that the building be in located a public place, nor does the freedom extend only to external views of the building.

Also allowed are photographs of certain artworks that are permanently situated in a public place or in premises open to the public, specifically sculptures, models for buildings, and "works of artistic craftsmanship". According to the standard reference work on copyright, Copinger and Skone James, the expression "open to the public" presumably includes premises to which the public are admitted only on licence or on payment. Again, this is broader than 'public place', which is the wording in many countries, and there is no restriction to works that are located outdoors.

Under the local approach to copyright, "works of artistic craftsmanship" are defined separately from "graphic works", and the freedom of section 62 does not apply to the latter. "Graphic works" are defined in section 4 as any painting, drawing, diagram, map, chart or plan, any engraving, etching, lithograph, woodcut or similar work. Accordingly, photographs may not freely be taken of artworks such as murals or posters even if they are permanently located in a public place.

The courts have not established a consistent test for what is meant by a "work of artistic craftsmanship", but Copinger suggests that the creator must be both a craftsman and an artist. Evidence of the intentions of the maker are relevant, and according to the House of Lords case of Hensher v Restawile [1976] AC 64, it is "relevant and important, although not a paramount or leading consideration" if the creator had the conscious purpose of creating a work of art. It is not necessary for the work to be describable as "fine art". In that case, some examples were given of typical articles that might be considered works of artistic craftsmanship, including hand-painted tiles, stained glass, wrought iron gates, and the products of high-class printing, bookbinding, cutlery, needlework and cabinet-making.

Other artworks cited by Copinger that have been held to fall under this definition include hand-knitted woollen sweaters, fabric with a highly textured surface including 3D elements, a range of pottery and items of dinnerware. The cases are, respectively, Bonz v Cooke [1994] 3 NZLR 216 (New Zealand), Coogi Australia v Hyrdrosport (1988) 157 ALR 247 (Australia), Walter Enterprises v Kearns (Zimbabwe) noted at [1990] 4 EntLR E-61, and Commissioner of Taxation v Murray (1990) 92 ALR 671 (Australia).

The Design and Artists Copyright Society and Artquest provide further information on UK freedom of panorama.

United States

Architectural works

United States copyright law contains the following provision:

The definition of "architectural work" is a building, which is defined as "humanly habitable structures that are intended to be both permanent and stationary, such as houses and office buildings, and other permanent and stationary structures designed for human occupancy, including but not limited to churches, museums, gazebos, and garden pavilions".

Other works
Nevertheless, the United States freedom of panorama does not cover other artistic works still covered by copyright, including sculptures. Usages of images of such works for commercial purposes may become copyright infringements.

The case Gaylord v. United States, No. 09-5044 involved the United States Postal Service's use of an image of 14 out of 19 statues of soldiers in the Korean War Veterans Memorial for their commemorative stamp in the 50th anniversary of the Korean War armistice in 2003. USPS did not obtain permission from Frank Gaylord, sculptor of the artistic work called The Column, for their use of the image on their stamp, which cost 37 cents.  Gaylord filed suit against USPS in 2006 for violation of his copyright over the sculpture. Included in the suit was former Marine John Alli, who was the photographer of the image used by USPS. Eventually, an amicable settlement was reached with Alli when the photographer agreed to pay Gaylord a 10% royalty for any subsequent sales of his image of the statues.

In a 2008 decision of the Court of Federal Claims, it was determined that USPS did not infringe Gaylord's copyright as their use complies with fair use. Nevertheless the court determined that The Column is not covered by the Architectural Works Copyright Protection Act (AWCPA) as it is not an architectural work of art. The side of the sculptor appealed, and on February 25, 2010, the Federal Circuit reversed the earlier decision regarding fair use. The use of the image of The Column in the commemorative stamp by USPS cannot be considered as a fair use since it is not transformative in nature (the context and intended meaning in the stamp remained the same as that of the actual sculpture). The presence of the artistic work in the stamp is substantial, and this also fails fair use. The purpose of USPS over this use is considered commercial, because it earned $17 million from its sales of almost 48 million stamps bearing this image. The Federal Circuit upheld the earlier decision of the Court of Federal Claims that The Column is not a work of architecture. On remand in 2011, the Court of Federal Claims awarded $5,000 in damages.  Gaylord appealed the amount of the damages, and in 2012 the appeals court "remanded the case for a determination of the fair market value of the Postal Service's infringing use". On September 20, 2013, the Court of Federal Claims awarded a total of $684,844.94 worth of economic rights damage that was to be paid by USPS to Gaylord.

USPS also faced legal action over their use of a Getty Images-sourced photo of the Las Vegas replica of the Statue of Liberty at New York-New York Hotel & Casino in their stamps. While they provided attribution to the photographer, they failed to give attribution to Robert Davidson, sculptor of the replica. From December 2010 to January 2014 the USPS sold up to 4.9 billion stamps bearing the replica, which amounted to $2.1 billion in sales. Although they became aware in March 2011 that the image being used was not of the original Statue of Liberty, USPS made no action, other than to "correct the catalogue information connected with the stamp." Davidson filed a case against USPS in 2013. The court upheld Davidson's stand that his replica was original enough to be copyrightable due to having more modern and feminine appearance of its face. USPS failed on the "purpose" and "portion used" criteria on fair use, though they passed the "effect of the use" criterion as Davidson stated he had no plans to make profit over his sculpture. Neither party was favored for the "nature of the copyrighted work" criterion on fair use. The court found USPS guilty of copyright infringement, and awarded Davidson $3.5 million in damages to be paid by USPS.

Italian-born American sculptor Arturo Di Modica has claimed copyright over the landmark Charging Bull in New York City's Lower Manhattan. He filed lawsuits against various entities exploiting his bull sculpture for commercial purposes, including Walmart in 2006 for selling lithographs of it, North Fork Bank also in 2006 for their inclusion of the sculpture in a national television commercial, and Random House in 2009 over the use of an image of the sculpture in the cover of a book about the fall of the Lehman Brothers. The cases concluded with settlements.

The creator of the country's second-largest "hammered copper" statue, Portlandia, fiercely protects his copyright over it. Raymond Kaskey has threatened anyone who has attempted to use pictorial representations of the sculpture in postcards, T-shirts, and other commercial media or objects with lawsuits. Portland-based Laurelwood Pub and Brewery reached a cash settlement with Kaskey after he sued them for their use of an image of the sculpture in the label of their Portlandia Pils beer in 2012.

Chicago's Cloud Gate sculpture is copyrighted by its artist Anish Kapoor, despite its situation in a public park, and according to attorney Henry Kleeman only the City of Chicago has the user right to exploit the bean-shaped sculpture commercially as they bought a "perpetual paid-up license". The artist filed a lawsuit against National Rifle Association (NRA) in 2018 for their inclusion of the public art in their video advertisement, demanding "$150,000 per infringement" with the number "to be determined according to proof presented in the court." NRA later removed the image of the sculpture from their advertisement, but didn't pay Kapoor and labelled the lawsuit as "baseless".

Vietnam 
Freedom of panorama in Vietnam is restricted to non-commercial photography and television broadcasting of public art and architecture. Article 25(h) of the newly-amended Vietnamese copyright law (2022) states it is permitted to photograph and broadcast publicly-displayed works of plastic art, architecture, and applied art "for the purpose of presenting images of these works," but not for commercial purposes.

Two-dimensional works
The precise extent of this permission to make pictures in public places without having to worry about copyrighted works being in the image differs amongst countries. In most countries, it applies only to images of three-dimensional works that are permanently installed in a public place, "permanent" typically meaning "for the natural lifetime of the work". In Switzerland, taking and publishing images of two-dimensional works such as murals or graffiti is permitted, but such images cannot be used for the same purpose as the originals.

Public space
Many laws have subtle differences in regard to public space and private property. Whereas the photographer's location is irrelevant in Austria, in Germany the permission applies only if the image was taken from public ground, and without any further utilities such as ladders, lifting platforms, airplanes etc. Under certain circumstances, the scope of the permission is also extended to actually private grounds, e.g. to publicly accessible private parks and castles without entrance control, however with the restriction that the owner may then demand a fee for commercial use of the images.

In many Eastern European countries the copyright laws limit this permission to non-commercial uses of the images only.

There are also international differences in the particular definition of a "public place". In most countries, this includes only outdoor spaces (for instance, in Germany), while some other countries also include indoor spaces such as public museums (this is for instance the case in the UK and in Russia).

See also
 Copyleft
 Directive on Copyright in the Digital Single Market
 Free content
 Photography and the law
 Public domain
 Trademark

References

External links

 Photographing public buildings, from the American Society of Media Photographers.
 Millennium Park Photography: The Official Scoop, The Chicagoist, February 17, 2005.
 MacPherson, Linda: Photographer's Rights in the UK.
 

Copyright law
Photography
Public sphere